Damon Michael Denson (born February 8, 1975) is a former American football player.  He played college football as a defensive tackle and offensive guard for the University of Michigan from 1993 to 1996.  He played professional football as an offensive guard in the National Football League (NFL) for the New England Patriots from 1997 to 1999.

Early years
Denson was born in Aliquippa, Pennsylvania, in 1975. A few years after his birth, his parents moved from Aliquippa to Baldwin, Pennsylvania, a suburb of Pittsburgh. He attended Baldwin High School where he played for the legendary WPIAL Hall of Fame coach Don Yannessa. Denson became only the second player in Baldwin High School history to start on the varsity football team as a true freshman. While playing in the highly competitive  WPIAL, Denson had to face the likes of future Pro Football Hall of Fame player Jason Taylor and future Super Bowl Champion Mike Logan who would eventually become his 1997 Draft classmates. In his junior year, the Fighting Highlanders beat North Hills High School to win their first playoff game in over three decades. During his senior year, Denson was selected as a USA Today High School All-American and chosen to play in the prestigious Big 33 Pennsylvania Football High School All Star Game playing alongside Jon Ritchie and Ron Powlus.

University of Michigan
Denson enrolled at the University of Michigan in 1993 and played college football for the Michigan Wolverines football teams from 1993 to 1996. He started his career as a defensive tackle, starting four games at that position as a true freshman in 1993 and one game in 1994 playing alongside Ty Law and Trevor Pryce.

As a junior, Denson was converted to an offensive guard. He started one game at the position in 1995 and all 12 games in 1996.  Along with Jon Runyan, Jon Jansen and Rod Payne, Denson helped Tim Biakabutuka rush for 1,818 yards, still Michigan's single-season rushing record, in 1995.  Denson was named a first-team guard on the 1996 All-Big Ten Conference football team while blocking for Brian Griese and Heisman trophy winner Charles Woodson.

Professional football
Denson was selected by the New England Patriots in the fourth round (97th overall pick) of the 1997 NFL Draft. He played for the Patriots under coach Pete Carroll from 1997 to 1999. He appeared in 16 games for the Patriots in 1998, four of them as a starter at offensive guard.

Legacy

For Thanksgiving 2015 Denson and his family were featured in an NFL Football Dads Football Is Family commercial where he discusses how the game of football has brought his family closer together and what it means to share the sport with his children.

Faith and personal life
Denson was converted to Christianity during his freshman year at Michigan. He joined a local church where he was ordained as a minister and began teaching bible study on campus. After being drafted by the New England Patriots, he continued to minister as an evangelist at a local Boston church. He has worked as a minister in churches and prisons as well as performing chaplain duties for professional sports teams and speaking at the prestigious NFL sanctioned Super Bowl Gospel Celebration.
 
Denson started his own ministry.

Denson and his wife, Camille, have two children.

References

1975 births
Living people
Converts to Christianity
People from Aliquippa, Pennsylvania
Players of American football from Pennsylvania
American football offensive guards
Michigan Wolverines football players
New England Patriots players
American Christian clergy
American evangelists
American motivational speakers
People from Allegheny County, Pennsylvania